The Third Eye Centre was a contemporary arts centre in Glasgow, founded by Scottish writer Tom McGrath in 1975. The building was at 350 Sauchiehall Street, close to the Glasgow School of Art, and was purchased by the Scottish Arts Council. The venue closed in the early 1990s to become the Centre for Contemporary Arts in 1992.

The choice of the centre's name was influenced by the teaching of  Indian spiritual master Sri Chinmoy who also gave a talk there.

The venue hosted exhibitions and performances by many artists such as Allen Ginsberg, Whoopi Goldberg, John Byrne, Edwin Morgan, and Damien Hirst.

References

External links
Photograph of the Third Eye Centre, 1978

Arts centres in Scotland
1975 establishments in Scotland